= Honorific title =

Honorific title may refer to:

- Honorific, a title that conveys esteem, courtesy, or respect for position or rank when used in addressing or referring to a person
- Title of honor, a title bestowed upon individuals or organizations as an award in recognition of their merits
